Stompin' at the Savoy – Live is an album by American R&B/funk band Rufus with singer Chaka Khan, released on the Warner Bros. Records label in 1983.

Stompin' at the Savoy was a double-record set featuring three sides of live material recorded at The Savoy in New York which sees the band reunited with Chaka Khan and performing all their biggest hits such as "Tell Me Something Good", "You Got the Love", "Sweet Thing", "At Midnight (My Love Will Lift You Up)", and "Do You Love What You Feel" as well as "What Cha' Gonna Do for Me" from Khan's 1981 solo album of the same name.

The fourth side of the album included four new studio recordings of which two were released as singles, "Ain't Nobody" and "One Million Kisses". "Ain't Nobody", written by the band's keyboardist David "Hawk" Wolinski, became Rufus' final #1 R&B hit, reached #22 on the Billboard Hot 100 singles chart, also won them a Grammy Award for Best R&B Performance by a Duo or Group with Vocal in 1984 and has since come to be regarded as one of Khan's own signature tunes - although it in fact was recorded with Rufus. Both "Ain't Nobody" and "One Million Kisses" were included on her 1989 remix compilation Life is a Dance - The Remix Project. Additionally, "Ain't Nobody" was featured in the movie Breakin' and its soundtrack.

The Stompin' at the Savoy – Live album which was a major commercial success, reaching #4 on Billboards R&B Albums Chart as well as #50 on Pop, became Khan's final collaboration with Rufus and the band dissolved shortly after its release. Quincy Jones wrote the liner notes for the album.

Stompin at the Savoy - Live was transferred from vinyl to CD in the early 1990s and remains in print.

Track listing

Personnel
 Chaka Khan - vocals
Rufus
 Tony Maiden - vocals, guitar
 Kevin Murphy - keyboards
 David "Hawk" Wolinski - keyboards
 John Robinson - drums, percussion
 Bobby Watson - bass guitar
Additional Musicians live
 Lenny Castro - percussion
 David Williams - rhythm guitar
 Stephanie Spruill - additional tambourine
Background Vocals
 Stephanie Spruill
 Lee Maiden
 Julia Tillman
Horn Section
 Jerry Hey - trumpet
 Ernie Watts - tenor saxophone, flute and all saxophone solos
 Larry Williams - alto saxophone, flute
 Gary Herbig - tenor saxophone, flute
Additional Musicians studio
 Joe Sample - piano on "Don't go to Strangers"
 James Newton Howard - additional synthesizer
 Paulinho da Costa - percussion
 Greg Phillinganes - synthesizer bass on "Try a Little Understanding"

Horn arrangements: Jerry Hey

String and horn arrangement on "Don't Go To Strangers" by Ralph Burns

Trivia
Warner Bros. also filmed the performance for a documentary and the album was to be the soundtrack, but, for unknown reasons, decided to shelve the documentary, but still release the album.

Production
Russ Titelman - record producer
 Mark Linett- engineer
Track 1–13 recorded at the Savoy Theatre, NY.

Later samples
"Ain't Nobody"
"I Know You Got Soul" by Eric B. & Rakim from the album Paid in Full
"Last Night" by Kid 'n Play from the album 2 Hype
"Beat Blaster" by Rodney O & Joe Cooley from the album Three the Hard Way
"Ain't Nobody Better" by Yo-Yo from the album Make Way for the Motherlode
"Ain't Nobody" by LL Cool J from the soundtrack of Beavis and Butt-Head Do America
"Ain't Nobody" by Faith Evans from the album Faith
"Rollin'" by Lil' Troy from the album Sittin' Fat Down South

Charts
Album

Singles

References

Rufus (band) albums
Chaka Khan albums
Albums produced by Russ Titelman
1983 live albums
Collaborative albums
Warner Records live albums